Swathi Reddy (born 19 April 1987) is an Indian actress and television presenter who predominantly works in Telugu films, along with Tamil and Malayalam films. Her nickname Colours Swathi comes from her stint in the Telugu television show Colours, which was telecast on Maa TV. 

After playing supporting roles, she made her debut as a lead actress in the Tamil film Subramaniapuram (2008). Her role in the Telugu film Ashta Chamma (2008) earned her the Filmfare Award and Nandi Award for Best Actress. She also worked as a dubbing artist, and a playback singer in a few films. Her other notable films include Aadavari Matalaku Arthale Verule (2007), Swamy Ra Ra (2013), Amen (2013), and Karthikeya (2014).

Early life and education

Swathi Reddy was born in the city of Vladivostok, located in the southerly reaches of the Russian Far East in the erstwhile Soviet Union. Her father, who was an officer in the Indian Navy, was training as a submariner in the Soviet Union when she was born. The Russian lady doctor named her ‘Svetlana’ but later her mom changed it to 'Swathi'. She has one elder brother named Siddharth. 

Reddy's family moved to Mumbai and later to the Eastern Naval Command, Visakhapatnam, where she spent most of her childhood. She did her schooling at St. Francis De Sales’ School in Visakhapatnam. While studying in 11th class, she moved to Hyderabad. She enrolled at St. Mary's College in Yousufguda, Hyderabad and graduated in Biotechnology.

After her EAMCET, she ventured into television at the age of 17 by hosting a show called Colours. Due to a positive response, the show was further extended and moved to the primetime slot. She went on to present over 150 episodes.

Career

Acting
After the completion of her first year of graduation, she got an offer to make her film debut in Krishna Vamsi's Danger (2005). She was part of an ensemble cast and was one of the five leads. The film received mixed to positive reviews. Priyanka Pulla of fullhyd.com wrote, "Swati making her much-anticipated debut here, has a role somewhat akin to a single member in a Mexican wave - contributory, but not self-sufficient enough to be judged."

After her second year of graduation, she did a supporting role in Aadavari Matalaku Ardhalu Verule (2007). The film won her good acclaim.

After the completion of her graduation she signed two films. In 2008, she debuted as a female lead in her first Tamil film Subramaniapuram. For her performance in Ashta Chamma(2008), she won the Filmfare Award for Best Actress – Telugu and Nandi Award for Best Actress. She made her debut in Malayalam cinema with Amen (2013) which was a super hit.

Other work
Swathi Reddy has been occasionally working as a dubbing artist and playback singer as well. In 2008, she had dubbed for actress Ileana in the film Jalsa (2008). In 2010, she gave her voice to an HIV/AIDS education animated software tutorial created by the nonprofit organization TeachAids. In 2011, she turned playback singer, rendering her voice for two songs, "Unbelievable" and "A Square B Square", for the soundtrack albums of her own film Katha Screenplay Darsakatvam Appalaraju (2011) and 100% Love (2011), respectively. She has also appeared in an advertisement for "Cadbury's Dairy Milk".

Personal life
Reddy married her boyfriend Vikas Vasu, a Malayali pilot, on 30 August 2018.

Filmography

Films

Musical Short

Playback singer

Dubbing artist/voice actor

Awards and nominations

References

External links

 

Telugu actresses
Indian voice actresses
Actresses in Telugu cinema
Indian film actresses
Actresses in Tamil cinema
Living people
Filmfare Awards South winners
Telugu playback singers
Actresses in Malayalam cinema
Nandi Award winners
21st-century Indian actresses
Indian women playback singers
Indian women television presenters
People from Visakhapatnam
1987 births
21st-century Indian women singers
21st-century Indian singers